The 2001 season of 1. deild karla was the 47th season of second-tier football in Iceland.

Standings

Top scorers

References
Final table on official KSÍ website
Top scorers on official KSÍ website

1. deild karla (football) seasons
Iceland
Iceland
2